The Louis Notari Library is the National library of Monaco, founded in 1909. It has been the legal deposit and copyright library for Monaco since 1925. It has more than 400,000 books. It is named for Monegasque writer Louis Notari.

References

External links
Official site 

Government of Monaco
Libraries in Monaco
Monaco
Deposit libraries
1909 establishments in Monaco